The Belite Ultra Cub is an ultralight aircraft built by Belite Aircraft and intended as a tribute to the Piper Cub on the occasion of its 75th anniversary. The UltraCub was introduced at AirVenture 2012.

Design and development
The Ultra Cub is a single-engine, single-place, strut-braced high-wing monoplane with either tricycle or conventional landing gear. The fuselage is constructed of riveted aluminum tubing with Dacron fabric substrate and (optionally) Oracal (adhesive vinyl) colored covering. The wing spar is aluminum with birch wood ribs, although a carbon fiber spar option is available. The wings can be folded for ground transportation or storage. The landing gear is made from spring steel. Storage includes three under-seat lockers. The turtledeck is removable. The standard engine used is the  Half VW four-stroke powerplant.

Variants
Sealite

Specifications (Ultra Cub)

See also

References

External links

Homebuilt aircraft